Jenna Hagglund (born 28 May 1989) is an American female volleyball player.

Career 
She was member of the United States national team that won the 2015 Pan American Games gold medal,  and the 2013 FIVB Women's World Grand Champions Cup.

On the college level, she played for University of Washington.

On the club level she played for Futura Volley in 2013.

References 

Living people
1989 births
American women's volleyball players
Washington Huskies women's volleyball players
Setters (volleyball)
Pan American Games gold medalists for the United States
Pan American Games medalists in volleyball
Volleyball players at the 2015 Pan American Games
Medalists at the 2015 Pan American Games
21st-century American women